Marcus Tullius Reynolds (August 20, 1869 – March 18, 1937) was an American architect from the Albany, New York area. Born in Great Barrington, Massachusetts, he was raised by his aunt in Albany after the death of his mother. He attended Williams College and Columbia University and began his life as an architect in 1893. He is well known for his bank designs and specifically his design of the Delaware and Hudson Railroad Company Building in downtown Albany. Many of his buildings still stand today; some are listed on the National Register of Historic Places. He was the brother of the Albany historian and author Cuyler Reynolds.

Early years
Reynolds was born on August 20, 1869 to Dexter and Catherine Reynolds (née Cuyler) in Great Barrington, Massachusetts. When Catherine Reynolds died in 1875, Dexter placed Marcus and his brother Cuyler under the care of Dexter's sister Laura, widow of Bayard Van Rensselaer, moving them to 98 Columbia Street in Albany, New York. The Reynolds' family connection to the Van Rensselaer family allowed the boys to grow up surrounded by "wealthy, socially, and politically connected Dutch and New England heritage".

As a boy, Reynolds attended Miss Gaylord's Boarding School in Catskill, New York. He later attended The Albany Academy in Albany and graduated from St. Paul's School in Concord, New Hampshire in 1886. He entered Williams College in Williamstown, Massachusetts in the fall, where he became involved in the Sigma Phi fraternity. Reynolds was an avid photographer while in college, documenting architectural details on campus as well as collecting portraits of many of his classmates. Reynolds decided to pursue architecture and enrolled in the architectural program at Columbia University's School of Mines after graduating from Williams in 1890. Reynolds graduated from Columbia in 1893. His thesis, Housing of the Poor in American Cities, won him a prize from the American Economic Society and earned him an honorary Master of Arts degree from Williams College. It is still cited in scholarly work to this day.

Professional years
Rather than remain in New York City like many of classmates, Reynolds returned to Albany to begin his professional life. Indeed, Reynolds' social status and connections helped him significantly when looking for work; many of his high-class family friends became clients. Reynolds' first commissions out of college the demolition of the decrepit Van Rensselaer Mansion, which was owned by his cousins. He had much of the original building moved to Williams College where it was incorporated into the replacement Sigma Phi house. The structure was in such bad shape, much of the material was not usable in the new building. His efforts on this project supported his second published work, The Colonial Buildings of Rensselaerwyck.

The most notable of Reynolds' works is the Delaware and Hudson Railroad Company Building (D&H Building)—now known as the SUNY System Administration Building—located on Broadway at the bottom of State Street. Bank designs are considered his specialty. Many of his designs took advantage of sites in the city. For example, the D&H Building on its own plaza on Broadway at the base of State Street; the First Trust Company Building diagonally across from D&H plaza; the replacement Albany Academy building on Academy Road; and the Hackett Middle School on Delaware Avenue. Reynolds' practice was not just limited to Albany. He designed the Gideon Putnam hotel in Saratoga Springs, and designed banks in Catskill, Hudson, Amsterdam, and New York City. Many of his buildings are listings on the National Register of Historic Places.

Reynolds died on March 18, 1937 of appendicitis. He is credited by at least one historian for no less than "chang the face of downtown Albany."

Albany County Portfolio

Greene County Portfolio

Saratoga County Portfolio

Published works

References

1869 births
1937 deaths
Cuyler family
Architects from Albany, New York
Williams College alumni
Columbia School of Engineering and Applied Science alumni
St. Paul's School (New Hampshire) alumni
People from Great Barrington, Massachusetts
Architects from Massachusetts
The Albany Academy alumni